Bear Family Records is a Germany-based independent record label, that specializes in reissues of archival material, ranging from country music to 1950s rock and roll to old German movie soundtracks.

History
The label has been in existence since 1975, founded by collector Richard Weize, started with the double LP Going Back to Dixie by Bill Clifton. It has become known for its extravagant (and expensive) box sets. The company describes itself as "a collector's record label" due to its primary business, which is reissuing rare recordings in CD format in small amounts. Historically, their material has had only limited availability in the U.S, stocked at Ernest Tubb Record Shop, and through mail order sources. Many of their box sets are available through Amazon Marketplace.

Artists
Among the many artists who have been the subject of extensive box set releases by Bear Family are Bob Wills, Merle Haggard, Waylon Jennings, David Allan Coe, Hank Snow, Jim Reeves, Johnny Cash, Willie Nelson, Dean Martin, Bill Haley & His Comets, the Kingston Trio, Louis Jordan, the Everly Brothers, Chet Atkins, Ann-Margret, Pat Boone, Frankie Laine, Petula Clark, Burl Ives, the Carter Family, Fats Domino, Rosemary Clooney, Doris Day, Connie Francis, Lesley Gore, Ricky Nelson, Nat King Cole, Gene Autry, Johnny Sea, Joe Dowell, the Treniers, Porter Wagoner, Dolly Parton, Jerry Lee Lewis, The Vipers Skiffle Group and Weldon Rogers.

Bear Family has also made a habit of producing thorough compilations of artists with a more limited fanbase, such as two separate five-CD Johnnie Ray collections, six-CD box sets of Slim Whitman and the Orioles, a seven-CD Rod McKuen set, eight-CD collections of Lonnie Donegan, Del Shannon, Neil Sedaka and Gene Vincent, a nine-CD omnibus of Johnny Burnette, a 16 CD omnibus of Jim Reeves, or a set of five boxed sets with a total of 26 CDs covering Doris Day's complete recording history for Columbia Records

Compilations
The company has also released several hundred 'Various Artists' compilations, organized by theme or genre.  These include such eclectic projects as a ten-CD political protest song box set, an eleven-CD set of the Jewish and Yiddish performers of the mid-1930s, a seven-CD box featuring 195 different versions of the song "Lili Marleen," compilations of music based on and from the TV series Bonanza, a four-CD collection of British music hall songs of the early 20th century, a ten-CD set of late-1930s calypso music, a 52-CD "History of Pop Music" set and a 26-CD compilation detailing the country hit parade from 1945 to 1970.

In 1982, RCA combined song sung independently by Reeves and Patsy Cline into duets using three-track mastering recorders onto a 24-track tape. New orchestration and new backing tracks were added, and the tracks were then remixed for stereo. RCA's similar album was, Greatest Hits of Jim Reeves & Patsy Cline.  These duets appeared on the Remembering Patsy Cline & Jim Reeves LP.

In 1996, the label released a 16 CD compilation titled Welcome to my World, by Jim Reeves, including more than 75 unissued titles and many demo recordings.

See also
 Bear Family Records albums
 List of record labels

References

External links
 
 Bear Essentials – Bear Family Records reviews (updated often)
 Conelrad: Atomic Platters – with information on the 2005 Bear release

German independent record labels
German country music record labels
IFPI members
Record labels established in 1975
Reissue record labels
Rock and roll record labels